Haines Borough is a home-rule borough located in the state of Alaska. As of the 2020 census, the population was 2,080, down from 2,508 in 2010.

Geography

Adjacent boroughs and census areas
 Municipality of Skagway Borough, Alaska – northeast
 Juneau City and Borough, Alaska – southeast
 Hoonah-Angoon Census Area, Alaska – south, west
 Stikine Region, British Columbia – northwest, east

National protected area
 Tongass National Forest (part)
 Endicott River Wilderness

Demographics

At the 2000 census there were 2,392 people, 991 households, and 654 families living in the borough.  The population density was 0.88 people per square mile (0,34/km2).  There were 1,419 housing units at an average density of 0.52 per square mile (0,20/km2).  The racial makeup of the borough was 82.53% White, 0.13% Black or African American, 11.50% Native American, 0.71% Asian, 0.08% Pacific Islander, 0.42% from other races, and 4.64% from two or more races.  1.38% of the population were Hispanic or Latino of any race.
Of the 991 households 31.60% had children under the age of 18 living with them, 54.00% were married couples living together, 7.30% had a female householder with no husband present, and 34.00% were non-families. 27.10% of households were one person and 7.20% were one person aged 65 or older.  The average household size was 2.41 and the average family size was 2.94.

The age distribution was 25.60% under the age of 18, 5.30% from 18 to 24, 28.20% from 25 to 44, 30.40% from 45 to 64, and 10.50% 65 or older.  The median age was 41 years. For every 100 females, there were 102.50 males.  For every 100 females age 18 and over, there were 103.10 males.

Transportation
Haines is one of the northern stops on the Alaska Marine Highway. Many people who travel in winter travel to Haines by ferry to avoid travelling the "Alcan", or Alaska Highway. Haines is also accessible by air service from neighboring Juneau, Alaska.

Items of interest
Around November of each year, thousands of eagles descend en masse to feast on one of the salmon runs.  Many photographers come to attain easily  accessible photos of eagles.

Communities
The borough's 2002 consolidation eliminated its sole remaining incorporated city, Haines, which became a census-designated place (CDP). The following are the CDPs located within the borough:
 Covenant Life
 Excursion Inlet
 Haines
 Lutak
 Mosquito Lake
 Mud Bay

Politics

See also

 List of airports in the Haines Borough
 National Register of Historic Places listings in Haines Borough, Alaska
 Gold Rush: White Water

References

External links

Haines Convention and Visitors Bureau

 
1968 establishments in Alaska
Populated places established in 1968